Palhal is a settlement in the western part of the island of São Nicolau, Cape Verde. In 2010 its population was 100. It is situated 2 km west of Cabeçalinho and 5 km northeast of Tarrafal de São Nicolau.

See also
List of villages and settlements in Cape Verde

References

Villages and settlements in São Nicolau, Cape Verde
Tarrafal de São Nicolau